Ravi Poovaiah, is a Professor and  Emeritus Fellow at the IDC School of Design at IIT Bombay and a co-designer of the Indian electronic voting machine

Career 
Poovaiah has a degree in Mechanical Engineering from IIT Madras, a degree in Product Design and Graphic Arts from Rhode Island School of Design (RISD), Providence, USA and an M.Tech. degree from IIT Bombay.  At IIT Bombay, Poovaiah holds the D L Shah Chair for Innovation. He is the Coordinator of the 'e-Kalpa' project, that is sponsored by the MHRD, co-director of ‘The Centre of Social Media Innovations for Communities (COSMIC)’, a collaborative initiative between IIT Bombay, the National University of Singapore and Nanyang Technological University, Singapore  and the principal investigator of the D'Source project. Poovaiah has been instrumental in pushing for open sourcing of design and design education in schools.

Notable students 
 Pranav Mistry

Selected publications 
 Design for Tomorrow―Volume 1: Proceedings of ICoRD 2021: 221 (Smart Innovation, Systems and Technologies) 
 Design for Tomorrow-Volume 2: Proceedings of ICoRD 2021
 Design for Tomorrow―Volume 3: Proceedings of ICoRD 2021: 223 (Smart Innovation, Systems and Technologies)

References

External links 
 Google scholar profile
 
 Prof. Ravi Poovaiah | IIT Bombay
 Typography Day 2021

Year of birth missing (living people)
Academic staff of IIT Bombay
Rhode Island School of Design alumni
IIT Bombay alumni
IIT Madras alumni
Living people